Mouda is the largest village in Khandatara mauja.  Khandatara is a mauja (cluster village) in Bhadrak district of Orissa. There are about 10 temples in the village.

Places of interest
Salandi Escape can be visited to see how a branch (NALIA) escapes from main river Salandi river.
 A holy festival in the Month of march keeps the villagers busy and entertained for a week.
 Near by Bhadrakali Temple is a walking distance from Mouda
 Khandeswar Mahadev Temple, Mahadevpur, near Salandi Escape

How to reach
This village can be approached in two ways.
Mouda is about 5 km from Bhadrak Bus stand and about 7 km from Bhadrak railway station.

 From Bhadrak Bus stand take the following chronological route — Kacheri Bazar, Santhia (Bhadrak Women's College) - Purana Bazar - Garadpur - Durgapur - Mouda
 Alternatively From Bhadrak Bus stand take the following chronological route - Kacheri Bazar, Santhia (Bhadrak Women's College) - Purana Bazar - Banka Bazar - Uttar Bahini - Take a right turn near Baspur to reach Mouda.

See also
 Bhadrak

References

External links
 http://www.mapsofindia.com/maps/orissa/districts/bhadrak.htm
 http://bhadrak.nic.in/

Villages in Bhadrak district